Andrew Wilson (born December 1980 in Fife, Scotland is a Scottish rugby union footballer who played for Glasgow Warriors and Scotland. He could play at either flanker, or Number Eight.

Rugby union career

Amateur career

At an amateur level he played for Ellon, Aberdeen GSFP and Heriot's FP.

Professional career

He joined Glasgow Warriors in 2002. He made his debut against Cardiff RFC on 31 August 2002, becoming Glasgow Warrior No. 102.

International career

By 2002 he had represented Scotland at several levels: under-19, under-21, students and at sevens.

Engineering career

Wilson works as an engineer in the oil industry in Scotland.

References

External links
 

1980 births
Living people
Aberdeen GSFP RFC players
Caledonia Reds players
Ellon RFC players
Glasgow Warriors players
People educated at Ellon Academy
Rugby union flankers
Rugby union players from Fife
Rugby union wings
Scotland 'A' international rugby union players
Scotland international rugby union players
Scottish rugby union players